Lalmohan is a town in Bangladesh.

Lalmohan may also refer to:

 Lalmohan Upazila, a subdistrict of Bhola District in Bangladesh

People
 Lalmohan Ghosh, 1849–1909, President of the Indian National Congress
 Lalmohan Sen, 1909–1949, Indian revolutionary
 Lalmohan Ganguly, fictional crime-fiction author in the Feluda stories written by Satyajit Ray